Kjell Rasmussen (born 5 October 1927) is a Norwegian diplomat.

He was born in Trondhjem and is a mag.art. (PhD equivalent) by education. He started working for the Norwegian Ministry of Foreign Affairs in 1956. He served as the Norwegian ambassador to Greece from 1981 to 1986, and doubled as ambassador to Libya from 1984. He was the general inspector of the Norwegian foreign service from 1986 to 1989 and the Norwegian ambassador to Finland from 1989 to 1994.

References

1927 births
Possibly living people
People from Trondheim
Norwegian civil servants
Ambassadors of Norway to Greece
Ambassadors of Norway to Libya
Ambassadors of Norway to Finland